Kyphopteryx is a genus of winter stoneflies in the family Taeniopterygidae. There are about five described species in Kyphopteryx.

Species
These five species belong to the genus Kyphopteryx:
 Kyphopteryx brodskii (Zhiltzova, 1972)
 Kyphopteryx coniformis Chen & Du, 2019
 Kyphopteryx dorsalis Kimmins, 1947
 Kyphopteryx pamirica Zhiltzova, 1972
 Kyphopteryx yangi Du & Chen, 2019

References

Further reading

 
 

Taeniopterygidae